{{Infobox television
| image                = Russell Howard's Good News title.png
| caption              = Russell Howard's Good News titlescreen
| alt_name             = Russell Howard's Good News Extra (extended version)'
| genre                = Topical comedy stand-up, satire
| creator              = Russell Howard
| presenter            = Russell Howard
| theme_music_composer = Kasabian – "Fast Fuse" (instrumental)
| country              = United Kingdom
| language             = English
| num_series           = 10
| num_episodes         = 96
| producer             = 
| location             = 
| runtime              = 
| company              = Avalon Television
| channel              = 
| picture_format       = 
| audio_format         = Stereo
| first_aired          = 
| last_aired           = 
| related              = The Russell Howard Hour}}Russell Howard's Good News was a British comedy and topical news television show which was broadcast on BBC Three between 2009 and 2014, and on BBC Two between 2014 and 2015. Hosted by comedian Russell Howard, it offered his commentary on the news of the week through mostly stand-up, along with sketches and humorous video clips, whilst also having guest appearances from people who have been featured in the media recently. It was made by independent production company Avalon Television and produced by Mark Iddon, Robyn O'Brien and David Howarth. Repeats of earlier episodes are also broadcast on Comedy Central, Dave and W. The show also made an appearance on Children in Need 2011 and Red Nose Day 2013, featuring a number of sketches from recent episodes, as well as a new segment of "It's Not All Doom and Gloom". In February 2013, users of Digital Spy voted Good News as the Best Show Ever on BBC Three in the run-up to the channel's tenth anniversary.

On 9 June 2014, it was revealed that Good News would move from BBC Three to BBC Two following the broadcast of series 8. Series 9 was aired on BBC Two in late October of the same year, with the tenth and final series starting to air on 22 October 2015.

On 29 November 2016, the BBC announced that they have no immediate plans for another series of Good News for the foreseeable future, but said that Howard would still appear on their channels from time to time. Howard's show moved to Sky One, where it was retitled The Russell Howard Hour.

Show format

The show's format focused primarily on looking into various news stories that have occurred during the week, from within Britain or across the world, whether the story was a major piece or a simple minor one. Howard often provided commentary on these stories, often through stand-up, but also through using sketches, recurring gags (either within an episode, or throughout a series), clips taken from the internet (the owners are credited by the show), to derive comedy from either the story itself, or the subject it is dealing with. These stories were usually catalogued into various topics, with each topic cutting in between segments with stop-motion animated titles. These topics have included:

Big News (begins regular show, following the early series)
Sports
Celebrity
Society
Crime and Punishment
Politics (UK, World, and Weird)
Art and Culture
Animals
Religion
Children
Health
I Did Not Know That
Technology
Mystery Guest (Series 1-8), Guest (Series 9-10)
What Were They Thinking?
Stand Up (Good News Extra only)
Royal Wedding (Series 4 only)
People's Podium (Christmas Special and Series 5/6 only)
Headliners (Special episodes of Series 7 and 8)
It's Not All Doom and Gloom

Of these, only Big News, Mystery Guest/Guest and It's Not All Doom and Gloom were regular segments in the show, while topics for the other segments were determined by what news stories Howard looked into mostly for that week; some topics were mostly one-offs for a series, such as the Royal Wedding.

Mystery Guest/Guest
From Series 2 to Series 8, the show featured an interview segment called "Mystery Guest", which was always unrehearsed. In it, Howard was never told by his crew who he was meeting and interviewing, only that the guest he had was recently in the news during the week the episode was aired in; the story either featured in a national paper, a local/regional one, or a news website. As such, he had to guess what exactly they were in the news for, based upon clues provided by the guest and the crew, after which Howard would interview them, usually on their skills, hobbies, background, and why they performed something in the story they featured in. Often in most instances of this segment, his guest either did a demonstration of their abilities, or taught Howard something new, with the latter having seen him receive emergency rescue training, pick up new dance moves, play sports, and learn different fighting styles, amongst other things. In later series, a VIP guest was arranged by the crew for the series finale, who was famous in either TV, Film, or Sports and was someone Howard admired a lot; like other guests, Howard had to guess who they were thanks to clues given. Such guests were interviewed as always when identified, and some gave Howard something special to do with them; in one instance, the actor of Boba Fett from Star Wars performed a parody version of "Mastermind", asking Howard questions on the movie franchise.

Because these segments were unrehearsed, Howard was not often prepared for what would occur on stage, especially if he was to be taught something physical, and in some cases, it led to issues.  In an episode that was broadcast for Series 5, Howard had been taught how to do a series of simple stunts that he would use in a mocked fight scene with his guest. In order to prepare for this, he attempted to do a press-up on a breakable stool, which broke easily under his weight and caused him to fall hard upon his hand and break it.  Although he managed to complete the segment after being initially checked up by the crew, his hand had to be set in a cast after filming for the episode, meaning that the remaining episodes for the series and the selection of guests for them had to be arranged to be less physically demanding on the comedian.

Beginning with Series 9, the segment was revised and changed, renamed to "Guest", and became primarily an interview between Howard and his special guest, who is often someone that has made a great achievement or important contribution to life, and that was picked out by the national news.

It's Not All Doom and Gloom
"It's Not All Doom and Gloom" is used to end the show, since the second series, on a feel-good moment and to usually break away from the show's comedy.  This segment involves no comedy at all, as it primarily focuses on a heart-warming story, either of someone who has endured hardships in their life, troubles in their homeland, or disabilities to accomplish amazing feats or extraordinary achievements, a person who has done something incredible in their life, or someone who has done charity work to aid those less fortunate.  The only exception where this segment never ended the show was on the extended version, where stand-up comedy followed it.

Attack on Philip Davies MP
In November 2015 Howard attacked Conservative MP Philip Davies on his BBC show calling him an "arsehole", "windbag", "wanker" and a "toad-faced hypocrite", accusing the MP of filibustering (talking out a bill). Following a repeat in March 2016, Davies complained on the grounds of "inaccuracy" and "misrepresentation" and the BBC was forced to publish in the Clarifications and Corrections section of its website stating "Davies did not personally use up all the time available for the debate and that almost three hours remained after he sat down". Howard was also found to have misrepresented Davies' views on the disabled and the BBC noted: "that the programme did not fully represent his comments, which were, that it would be in the best interests of disabled people, and others, to be allowed to offer to work for less than the minimum wage, if the alternative were no employment at all". The broadcaster also agreed not to air the episode again due to their misrepresentation of Davies' position. The BBC Trust later rejected a further escalation of the complaint made by Davies.

Russell Howard's Good News ExtraRussell Howard's Good News Extra was an extended version of Good News, in the vein of Have I Got a Bit More News for You and QI XL. Usually broadcast on Saturday nights, Good News Extra episodes served as extended, uncut counterparts to those of the regular show. Typically, the episodes lasted 45 minutes long and feature a guest stand-up comedy act. The repeats shown on Comedy Central and Dave are actually Good News Extra episodes, but are simply listed as Russell Howard's Good News. Series 8 was the last series for which there was a Good News Extra version.

Transmissions

Viewing figures
Episode viewing figures from BARB. They do not include views on BBC HD.

Series 1

Series 2

Series 3

Series 4

Series 5

Series 6

Series 7

Series 8

Series 9

Series 10

DVD releases
A DVD was released on 15 November 2010 entitled Best of Series 1.

A DVD of the Best of Series 2'' was released on 24 September 2012.

References

External links

 Russell Howard's page on Chortle with latest news and tour dates 

Russell Howard's Good News Extra

2009 British television series debuts
2015 British television series endings
2000s British comedy television series
2010s British comedy television series
BBC high definition shows
BBC television comedy
British stand-up comedy television series
English-language television shows